The Rite Opératif de Salomon (Operative Rite of Solomon in English) is a Masonic rite that appeared in the 1960's as a result of research by Jacques de La Personne, then president of the Rituals Commission and deputy grand orator of the Grand Orient de France. It proposes to the Freemasons who practice it, a very symbolic approach of Freemasonry, with a particular accent put on the ceremonial of the Masonic meetings. This rite is mainly practiced within the Initiatic and Traditional Order of the Royal Art (OITAR) that Jacques de La Personne created in 1974.

History 
Jacques de La Personne, who entered Freemasonry at the Grand Orient de France on December 16, 1959, belongs to this generation of Freemasons who are passionate about the study of the French Rite from the sources of the texts, in the movement of brothers like René Guilly, for example. Initiated in the lodge "Les Inséparables du Progrès", he began his work in this workshop of which he became Worshipful Master in 1964. Becoming deputy grand orator and president of the commission of rites of the Grand Orient de France1, it is mandated by it to carry out his project that he obtains a patent to create the lodge "Les Hommes" which practices in experimental form the result of his work, namely: the first three degrees of what will become the Operative Rite of Solomon. The lodge was created on February 7, 1972.

The lodge "Les Hommes" still practices this rite. Thereafter, anxious to continue the experience of creating an original rite in the twentieth century in a freer, and wishing to open to the mix, it creates the Initiatory and Traditional Order of the Royal Art in January 1974 and detaches itself from the GODF to constitute an independent structure. The first lodge created in this new framework, "The Founders" became lodge number one of the OITAR2.

For nearly ten years, followed by several brothers and sisters from the GODF, but also from Droit Humain, he worked on the development of the rite both in terms of ritual books (ceremonies of the various degrees, etc.) but also in terms of books called: of operation, setting the uses and instructions of the order and its lodges. In the early 1980s, the project to continue to perfect the rite, within a lodge of research and study: the lodge "Hermes" is born. It is in particular to experiment with a new symbolic structure and in particular a different order of the Masonic degrees. The goal admitted by its designer is to make the second degree of blue masonry (the first three grades) the symbolic pivot of the rite.

Degrees of the Rite 

The Rite Opératif de Salomon practiced at OITAR is divided into nine degrees divided into three orders:

Worker Order of the Builders of the Temple (First Order - artisanal path in five degrees) 
Apprentice
Companion 
Master
Secret Master
Master Mason of the Mark

Knightly Order of the Temple of Solomon (Second Order - Knightly Way in two degrees) 
Knight of the Royal Arch
Knight of the Rose-Croix

Inner Order of the Holy Temple (Third Order - priestly path in two degrees) 
Passenger of Light
Master of the Ineffable Name

The first three degrees: apprentice, fellow, master, are, as the Masonic tradition requires, managed independently of the following degrees called "of Perfection" (from the fourth degree). The first three degrees are managed by a general grand master, surrounded by a council of territorial grand masters. The degrees called "Perfection" are managed by the Supreme Universal Council of the Rite.

The regalia for the Rite Opératif de Salomon are based on the color blue and white.

References 

Masonic rites
1972 establishments in France
Freemasonry in France